Djalil Narjissi (born 18 January 1980) is a Moroccan rugby union footballer who currently plays in the Top 14, for Agen. He joined Agen in 2004, having previously played for Castres. Narjissi is also the captain of the Morocco national team.

External links
 ERCrugby profile

1980 births
Living people
Moroccan rugby union players
Rugby union hookers
Moroccan expatriate rugby union players
Expatriate rugby union players in France
Moroccan expatriate sportspeople in France